Blair Robert Comley  is an economist. He is a former Secretary of the New South Wales Government Department of Premier and Cabinet, replaced by a new Secretary upon the election of the then Premier of NSW, The Hon Gladys Berejiklian.

Life and career
Blair Comley was born in the late 1960s. He holds a Bachelor of Economics (Honours) and a Master of Economics from Monash University and a Graduate Diploma in Legal Studies from the Australian National University.

Comley joined the Department of the Treasury in 1994. For three years, he represented Australia on economic policy at the OECD. In 2008, Comley was appointed Deputy Secretary of the Department of Climate Change. He was elevated to become head of the Department—by then known as the Department of Climate Change and Energy Efficiency—in 2010.

Comley was appointed Secretary of the Department of Resources, Energy and Tourism in February 2013, to commence 11 March that year. In September 2013, after the Abbott Government was sworn in, new Prime Minister Tony Abbott sacked Comley and two other departmental secretaries.

Comley was hired by PricewaterhouseCoopers in April 2014 as a Special Adviser in the Canberra Economics and Policy Team. By September 2014, he had been appointed head of the New South Wales Department of Premier and Cabinet. In November 2017, the NSW Premier, Hon Gladys Berejiklian MP announced he would be replaced by a new Secretary.

Awards
Comley was awarded a Public Service Medal in January 2012 for outstanding public service in the development of public policy, particularly in the areas of carbon pricing and emissions trading, tax policy design and debt management.

References

Living people
Year of birth missing (living people)
Australian public servants
Recipients of the Public Service Medal (Australia)
Place of birth missing (living people)
Monash University alumni
Australian National University alumni